Liberty Baseball Stadium is a baseball venue in Lynchburg, Virginia. It is the home field of the Liberty Flames baseball team, a member of the NCAA Division I ASUN Conference. The stadium opened in February 2013 and has a capacity of 2,500 spectators. It hosted the 2013 Big South Tournament.

History
In August 2011, Liberty University announced plans for a new baseball venue, which would be built next to Williams Stadium, the school's football venue. The venue was planned to replace Al Worthington Stadium, the Liberty baseball program's home field since the 1979 season. When the venue was initially announced, it was planned to have a capacity of roughly 3,000 spectators and construction costs of roughly $5 million. Construction on the venue began in 2012. It was completed in February 2013, immediately before the start of the 2013 season, with a capacity of 2,500 spectators and construction costs of more than $9 million.

The stadium's first game was played on February 23, 2013. Liberty defeated Penn State, 4-1, and a then stadium-record 2,565 spectators attended the game. Liberty won its first seven games in the venue, with the team's first loss coming against William & Mary on March 5. Liberty's regular season home record in 2013 was 20-9.

The new ballpark was rededicated as Worthington Field at Liberty Baseball Stadium in 2019.

Features
The stadium features an AstroTurf field. Its capacity of 2,500 spectators consists of chairback seats, berm seating, and standing room. It has a press box, three private suites, a concourse, concession stands, and an electronic scoreboard and video board. Practice areas and player lounges were also built with the stadium.

Events
The stadium hosted the 2013 Big South Tournament from May 21–25. Liberty, the fifth seed, won the tournament. Liberty was the first host school to win the Big South Tournament since 1992.

Attendance

See also
 List of NCAA Division I baseball venues

References

External links
Liberty University Baseball Stadium "Home Field Advantage" – Video Tour at youtube.com

College baseball venues in the United States
Baseball venues in Virginia
Liberty Flames baseball
Buildings and structures in Lynchburg, Virginia